Chained Echoes is a 2022 role-playing video game created by Matthias Linda and published by Deck13 Spotlight for Linux, macOS, Windows, Nintendo Switch, PlayStation 4, PlayStation 5, Xbox One and Xbox Series X/S. The game is inspired by classic Japanese role-playing games from the 1990s, featuring turn-based combat, 16-bit-style visuals, and a multi-character narrative. Linda was influenced by games such as Xenogears, Terranigma, Secret of Mana, Suikoden 2, Breath of Fire, The Legend of Dragoon and Final Fantasy VI. The game has been praised by several reviewers as living up to the quality of its inspiration, while offering modern advancements.

Gameplay 
Chained Echoes is a role-playing video game featuring 16-bit-style visuals and turn-based combat. Unlike most older role-playing games that feature random encounters, enemies are visible on the map and trigger encounters in the same screen, similar to Chrono Trigger. Battles are turn-based, and each character in the player's party has a standard attack, several special abilities, items, and a defensive stance.  In combat, party members use attacks and abilities that raise the "overdrive" meter, which reaches an optimal green zone where abilities are more effective. However, the overdrive meter can overheat, and the party must discharge some of the excess by using specific abilities, such as defenses and "Ultra Moves".

Chained Echoes is set in the continent of Valandis, in the time of a multi-generational war between three kingdoms. Unlike other role-playing games, characters in Chained Echoes do not level-up, instead levelling up skills automatically through battle, with added skill point rewards. The player will control a party of up to 8 characters. The game's estimated length is up to 30 or 40 hours.

Plot

Development 
The game was made by the German developer Matthias Linda, who grew up making fan games with RPG Maker. His favorite games included Xenogears, Terranigma, Secret of Mana, Suikoden 2, Breath of Fire, The Legend of Dragoon and Final Fantasy VI, all of which influenced his development of Chained Echoes. He was mindful not to copy them, instead trying to capture his experience of playing them, which he remembers "in my head, all these games look and play better than they actually did."

Development of the game took nearly 7 years, beginning in 2016 after a year of considering the story concept. The game had a successful Kickstarter campaign in 2019. The game was published by Deck13.

Reception 

The PC and Switch versions of Chained Echoes have received "universal acclaim", while the PlayStation 4 version has received "generally favorable reviews" on Metacritic.

Rock Paper Shotgun said that "Chained Echoes has taken all the right lessons from its 16-bit inspirations... [feeling] modern and nostalgic at the same time". Siliconera praised the game because "[t]he 16-bit art feels right for the style of the game, everyone in the large cast of characters feels distinct, the story is engaging, and the battle system feels familiar and unique at the same time." Nintendo Life called it one of the best role-playing games of the year, and "a wonderful mash-up of '90s JRPG tropes, masterfully woven together to produce an experience that feels simultaneously nostalgic and fresh". Windows Central spoke positively about the combat system and story, saying that "for those players with ingrained nostalgia for classic SNES JRPGs, Chained Echoes is an absolute must have title". Digitally Downloaded said that the game would reach the quality of best classic Japanese role-playing games, since "Chained Echoes not only meets that standard but, were this released back on the SNES when Final Fantasy IV, V, and VI were flying high, people would have considered them comparable." Screen Rant called the game "a must-play", because it is "a fresh, smart adventure that celebrates classic JRPGs while not being afraid to push into new directions".

References 

2022 video games
Deck13 games
Indie video games
Kickstarter-funded video games
Linux games
MacOS games
Nintendo Switch games
PlayStation 4 games
PlayStation 5 games
Retro-style video games
Role-playing video games
Single-player video games
Video games developed in Germany
Windows games
Xbox One games
Xbox Series X and Series S games